Sheilaism is a shorthand term for an individual's system of religious belief which co-opts strands of multiple religions chosen by the individual usually without much theological consideration. The term derives from a woman named Sheila Larson, who is quoted by Robert N. Bellah et al. in their book Habits of the Heart as following her own "little voice" in a faith she calls "Sheilaism".

History
In chapter 9 of their 1985 book Habits of the Heart, Robert N. Bellah, Richard Madsen, William M. Sullivan, Ann Swidler, and Steven M. Tipton discuss how religion in America has moved from being highly public and unified, as it was in colonial New England, to extremely private and diverse. To demonstrate the shift, they quote a young nurse, to whom they gave the name Sheila Larson:

Bellah et al. suggest that Sheilaism creates the logical possibility "of over 220 million American religions, one for each of us," and they see Sheilaism as "a perfectly natural expression of current American religious life". Oddrun M. H. Bråten wrote:

The coinage quickly became a touchstone for sociologists of religion who repeatedly reference it. One sociologist summed it up as "spiritual bricolage". Sheilaism even has worked its way into more mainstream culture.

The columnist Don Kahle concluded that Sheila "has a code of ethics, but it's no longer connected to a sacred text or an observing deity. It's personal – and unpublished. Sheila abides by Sheilaism. Sheilaism is good for Sheila, but it doesn't build community. Nobody but Sheila knows what are the codes of Sheilaism. Often Sheila doesn't know herself until something 'doesn't feel right'."

Criticism
Bellah et al. saw Sheilaism as a form of self-absorption that caused a disaffiliation with communities. Their perspective was very much in line with the prevailing view of sociologists since the 1960s who saw such highly individualized religious experience as proof of a larger decline in the importance of religion in the United States as a whole. In later comments, Bellah summed up the problem with Sheilaism: "she has made the inner trip and hasn't come back out again, so to speak."

The cultural critic Hal Niedzviecki juxtaposes Sheilaism with Judyism, the joke religion created by comedian Judy Tenuta. Whereas Tenuta is poking fun at the idea of an individualist religion, even titling a book The Power of Judyism, Niedzviecki laments the fact that Sheilaists take the idea seriously. "Sheilaism permeates our individualistic conformity and continues to demand that our institutions dramatically change to accept us as we want to be."

Recent scholarship has re-evaluated Sheilaism, noting that even those who claim a particular organized denomination and regularly attend church often have highly individualized perceptions of their faith.

See also

 Baháʼí Faith and the unity of religion
 Cafeteria Christianity
 Cultural Christian
 Cultural Hindu
 Cultural Jew
 Cultural Mormon
 Cultural Muslim
 Ethical monotheism
 Human Potential Movement
 Ietsism
 Lapsed Catholic
 Liberal Christianity
 Liberal Judaism
 Liberal and progressive movements within Islam
 Moralistic therapeutic deism
 Natural religion
 New Age
 Non-denominational
 Omnism
 Religious naturalism
 Religious syncretism
 Secular Buddhism
 Self religion
 Spiritual but not religious

References

Footnotes

Bibliography

 
 
 
 
 
 
 

Disengagement from religion
New religious movements
Self religions
Sociology of religion